The Department of Chemistry is responsible for chemistry teaching and research at Imperial College London. The department is one of the largest in the UK with around 63 academic staff, 10 teaching fellows, 95 postdoctoral research scientists and research fellows and 1150 students, including 240 PhD students,150 MRes students and around 750 students studying undergraduate courses.  This community is further supported by over 45 support and administrative staff. The department is based across two sites. 

The first is the Chemistry Building along Imperial College Road where students benefits from a dedicated teaching block looking over the Dangoor Plaza and the rejuvenated Queen’s Lawn at South Kensington campus. The second is the Molecular Sciences Research Hub (MSRH), a £170M new building for Chemistry on the White City Campus which sits at the heart of the White City Innovation District. The Molecular Sciences Research Hub is now home to all research in the Department of Chemistry and is where undergraduate students undergo their final year research projects.

History 

The origins of the department lie in the Royal College of Chemistry, which was founded in 1845 on Hanover Square, moving the next year to Oxford Street. Its first professor was August Wilhelm von Hofmann, from the University of Giessen. The college was later incorporated into the Normal School of Science as a department, and the school was refounded as the Royal College of Science in 1890. In 1907, the Royal College of Science became one of the founding institutions of Imperial College, which joined the University of London, only to leave it and become independent in 2007.

In 2018 the Molecular Sciences Research Hub opened at the college's new White City campus, becoming the new centre for the department's academic research. Teaching will continue at South Kensington, however, students undertake research projects at the new research hub.

Rankings 

 The Department of Chemistry is currently ranked 13th globally in the 2021 QS World University subject rankings, and 3rd in the UK.
 The 2021 Research Excellence Framework (REF) results saw the Department ranked 3rd overall in the UK (according to percentage of overall submission that was 4*) and was one of four to score 100% 4*in the UK for research environment.
 The EDI environment was recognised through renewal of its Athena SWAN Gold award (2019), one of only two in Chemistry.
 With respect to teaching, overall student satisfaction in the National Student survey (NSS) rose to 89% in 2022.
 The Department was ranked 3rd in the UK by the Times Good University Guide in 2022 and 6th by the Complete University Guide.

Research Infrastructure 
The Molecular Sciences Research Hub is 24,000m2 research facility providing state-of-the-art infrastructure for Chemistry with a capacity for 80 groups and >800 researchers including collaborating  groups from other departments stimulating connections between the chemical sciences and other disciplines.  The MSRH which spans 9 floor was built to high energy efficient standards, certified BREEAM excellent and awarded a 2019 global laboratory design S-Lab prize.  

The vision for the Imperial College White City campus where it is based is to co-locate academia and business with a view to supporting economic growth and local skills, enterprise and innovation with an impact locally and across the UK. The ethos of the campus is to break down traditional barriers to collaboration. This has stimulated a new wave of internal and external SMES to move into the area. The White City Innovation District itself is a fast emerging as a global economic hotspot in science, technology, engineering, mathematics, medicine, business (STEMMB), the arts and media.

In order to support the growth of the White City Innovation District the Department co-established the Deep Tech Network in partnership with Upstream. Upstream is a partnership between Hammersmith and Fulham Council and Imperial College London. The Deep Tech network runs a regular series of events and showcases that aim to foster links between all stakeholders in White City.

Teaching

Study

Undergraduate

The department offers three year BSc and four year undergraduate MSci courses. The department has connections with universities in Europe, allowing undergraduate master's students to study-abroad during their course. It also allows students to take a year in industry, and incorporate management or foreign languages into the course. All students graduating with an undergraduate degree from the department are also awarded the Associateship of the Royal College of Science, ARCS.

Postgraduate
The department is home to a large PhD student community with all students being aligned to one of the core research themes. The Department hosts three large-scale Centres for Doctoral Training: (i) the EPSRC Centre for Doctoral Training in Chemical Biology (ICB CDT), the EPSRC Centre in Synthesis and Reaction Technology and the Leverhulme Centre for Doctoral Training in Cellular Bionics. It is also a partner in the EPSRC Centre for Doctoral Training in Medical Imaging with Kings College London.

The department offers MRes and MSc courses in subject specialties including:

 MSc in Digital Chemistry
 MRes in Advanced Molecular Synthesis
 MRes in Biological and Physical Chemistry
 MRes in Chemical Biology and Bio-Entrepreneurship
 MRes in Catalysis: Chemistry and Engineering 
 MRes in Drug Discovery and Development
 MRes in Green Chemistry: Energy and the Environment
 MRes in Nanomaterials

People 
 August Wilhelm von Hofmann, first professor at the Royal College of Chemistry
 Martha Whiteley OBE, one of the inventors of mustard gas (also an alumna of the department)
 Sue Gibson OBE
 Anthony Gerard Martin Barrett FRS, FMedSci (also an alumnus of the department, BSc PhD)
 Lord George Porter OM PRS, 1967 Nobel Prize in Chemistry

Alumni 
 Frances Micklethwait MBE ARCS, first researcher into a cure for mustard gas
 Sir Derek Barton BSc ARCS PhD, 1969 Nobel Prize in Chemistry
 Sir Geoffrey Wilkinson BSc ARCS PhD, 1973 Nobel Prize in Chemistry

References 

1845 establishments in England
Educational institutions established in 1845
Chemistry
Chemistry